Jim Witter is the debut studio album by Canadian country music artist Jim Witter. It was released in 1993 by FRE Records. It includes the Top 10 singles "Everything and More", "Distant Drum", "Stolen Moments", "Sweet Sweet Poison" and "Chevy Coupe".

Track listing

References

1993 debut albums
Jim Witter albums